Robyn Léwis (October 1929 – 12 August 2019) was a Welsh author, politician and former archdruid of the National Eisteddfod of Wales.

Biography 
Born Robyn Lewis, he studied at Pwllheli Grammar School and University College of Wales, Aberystwyth before becoming a solicitor and barrister.  He became active in the Labour Party and stood, unsuccessfully, in Denbigh at the 1955 general election.

During the 1960s, Léwis left Labour and joined Plaid Cymru.  He was elected to Lleyn Rural District Council, and stood for the party in Caernarfon at the 1970 general election, where he came second with more than 33% of the vote. He was subsequently elected as a Vice President of Plaid Cymru.

In 1980, Léwis won the Prose Medal at the National Eisteddfod of Wales, and in 2002 he was the first Prose Medallist to become Archdruid, under the title "Robyn Llŷn". In this role, he inducted future Archbishop of Canterbury Rowan Williams as a Bard of the Gorsedd.

Léwis resigned from Plaid Cymru in 2006, in protest at the acceptance of an OBE by Elinor Bennett, the wife of Dafydd Wigley, a former leader of Plaid Cymru.

References

1929 births
2019 deaths
Alumni of Aberystwyth University
Bards of the Gorsedd
Councillors in Wales
People from Gwynedd
Welsh barristers
Welsh-language writers
Welsh solicitors
Welsh-speaking politicians
Labour Party (UK) parliamentary candidates
Plaid Cymru councillors
Plaid Cymru parliamentary candidates